Ancasi (possibly from Quechua for cobalt salt used for dyeing) is a mountain in the Huanzo mountain range in the Andes of Peru, about  high. It is situated in the Arequipa Region, La Unión Province, Puyca District. It lies southwest of Jatun Huaychahui. Chuañuma is east of Ancasi.

References 

Mountains of Peru
Mountains of Arequipa Region